Bhind railway station is a railway station in Bhind city of Madhya Pradesh. Its code is BIX. It serves Bhind city. The station consists of three platforms. Passenger, Express and Superfast trains halt here.

Major trains

 Jhansi–Etawah Link Express
 Ratlam–Bhind Express
 Etawah–Gwalior Passenger
 Bhind–Gwalior Passenger

References

Railway stations in Bhind district
Jhansi railway division